Sardis is a city in Burke County, Georgia, United States. The population is 999 at the 2010 census. It is part of the Augusta, Georgia metropolitan area in the Central Savannah River Area (CSRA).

Geography
Sardis is located in southeastern Burke County at  (32.974510, -81.758504).

History

Around the turn of the 20th century, a small crossroads community called Frog Wallow was developing in southeast Burke County.  With the construction of the Savannah & Atlanta Railway, the tiny town lay on the new railroad connecting the two large hubs.  In 1912, the town was incorporated as Sardis by the Georgia Legislature, named after the Baptist church that had flourished in the town over the past decades. The church's name, in turn, is a transfer from Sardis, an ancient city in present-day Turkey.

Sardis saw several decades of growth including a booming lumber industry.  Then, in 1962, the owner of the railroad (Central of Georgia) abandoned the section of tracks between Waynesboro and Sylvania, which negatively affected the local economy.  The tracks were subsequently removed in 1964. Sardis still retains its old train station and coal tower.

Demographics

2020 census

As of the 2020 United States census, there were 995 people, 328 households, and 198 families residing in the city.

2010 census
As of the 2010 United States Census, there were 999 people living in the city. The racial makeup of the city was 54.6% Black, 43.5% White, 0.3% Native American and 0.9% from two or more races. 0.7% were Hispanic or Latino of any race.

2000 census
As of the census of 2000, there were 1,171 people, 419 households, and 292 families living in the town. The racial makeup of the town was 55.34% African American, 44.24% White,  0.17% from other races, and 0.26% from two or more races. Hispanic or Latino of any race were 0.43% of the population.

There were 419 households, out of which 38.4% had children under the age of 18 living with them, 40.3% were married couples living together, 24.1% had a female householder with no husband present, and 30.3% were non-families. 26.7% of all households were made up of individuals, and 15.5% had someone living alone who was 65 years of age or older.  The average household size was 2.79 and the average family size was 3.43.

In the town the population was spread out, with 34.3% under the age of 18, 9.2% from 18 to 24, 25.5% from 25 to 44, 18.4% from 45 to 64, and 12.5% who were 65 years of age or older.  The median age was 30 years. For every 100 females, there were 84.7 males.  For every 100 females age 18 and over, there were 76.8 males.

The median income for a household in the town was $22,917, and the median income for a family was $28,083. Males had a median income of $25,000 versus $17,109 for females. The per capita income for the town was $11,128.  About 29.2% of families and 35.5% of the population were below the poverty line, including 46.4% of those under age 18 and 31.8% of those age 65 or over.

See also

Central Savannah River Area

References

External links
 Sardis Baptist Church historical marker

Cities in Burke County, Georgia
Cities in Georgia (U.S. state)
Augusta metropolitan area